The  Denver Broncos season was the team's 35th year in professional football and its 25th with the National Football League. The season would be the final year that Wade Phillips was head coach.

Offseason

NFL draft

Undrafted Free Agents

Personnel

Staff

Roster

Regular season

Schedule

Note: Intra-division opponents are in bold text.

Standings

Season summary

Week 13 vs Bengals

References

External links 
 Denver Broncos – 1994 media guide
 Broncos on Pro Football Reference
 Broncos Schedule on jt-sw.com

Denver Broncos
Denver Broncos seasons
Denver Broncos